En Purushanthaan Enakku Mattumthaan is a 1989 Indian Tamil-language drama film, directed by Manobala and written by P. Kalaimani. The film stars Vijayakanth, Suhasini and Rekha. It was released on 3 February 1989. The film was remade in Hindi as Mera Pati Sirf Mera Hai by the same director. It was also remade in Telugu as Naa Mogudu Naake Sontham and in Kannada as Hatamari Hennu Kiladi Gandu.

Plot 
Vatsala lives a wealthy lifestyle with her husband, Marudhu, who works for her father, and a daughter named Sharda. Vatsala and Marudhu do not get along and Vatsala suspects that Marudhu is having an affair. Her suspicious nature gets a boost when a woman named Saradha as Vatsala moves into a house next door. Vatsala starts vile rumors about Saradha having an affair with Marudhu. As a result of these rumors, no one is willing to marry Saradha, she is mocked by everyone in the community and even loses her bank job. Saradha decides to teach Vatsala a lesson by moving her belongings into her house, claiming that she is indeed Marudhu's mistress. The surprising thing is Marudhu agrees to this arrangement and permits her to live with them. Unable to assert herself, Vatsala leaves the house and goes to live with her parents.

Things are going well with Saradha, until one day when daughter goes missing. Sharda hectically attempts to locate Pinky but in vain. Then the police arrive to arrest Saradha on the charge of kidnapping Pinky and possibly killing her. The police indicate that they can prove that Saradha did indeed kidnap Pinky as she has a motive for continuing to live with Prakash as his mistress and wanted Pinky out of the way. It was Vatsala's plan to insult Sharda further by giving away her daughter to Nassar who wants to take revenge on Saradha as he lost his bank job because of her. Marudhu saves his daughter and gets Nassar arrested.

When Vatsala visits the temple and is completely shock to see the wedding arrangements between Marudhu and Saradha. She realises the error of her ways and apologizes for her behaviour. Marudhu who is happy with the plan reveals that the marriage is for the temple deity not their marriage. Marudhu and Vatsala gets united while Saradha leaves for another town.

Cast 
 Vijayakanth as Marudhu
 Suhasini as Saradha
 Rekha as Vatsala
 Janagaraj as Lawyer
 V. K. Ramasamy as Vatsala's father
 Vennira Aadai Moorthy as Marudhu's neighbour
 Nassar as Bank employee
 Thyagu as Vatsala's brother
 LIC Narasimhan as Bank manager

Soundtrack 
The music was composed by Ilaiyaraaja.

Reception 
The Indian Express wrote, "the film proceeds to interchange climax through contrived poignant sequences and with turns and bashups and some honeyed numbers tuned by Ilayaraja who seems to have taken special care".

References

External links 
 

1980s Tamil-language films
1989 drama films
1989 films
Films directed by Manobala
Films scored by Ilaiyaraaja
Indian drama films
Tamil films remade in other languages